Per Hjertquist (born 6 April 1960) is a former professional tennis player from Sweden.  During his career he won one singles title and one doubles title. He achieved a career-high singles ranking of world No. 68 in 1980 and a career-high doubles ranking of world No. 106 in 1985. As a junior, he was ranked 2nd after Ivan Lendl, and in 1978, became the US Open boys' singles champion.

Career finals

Singles (1 title, 2 runners-up)

Doubles (1 title)

External links
 
 

1960 births
Living people
People from Nässjö Municipality
Swedish male tennis players
US Open (tennis) junior champions
Grand Slam (tennis) champions in boys' singles
Sportspeople from Jönköping County
20th-century Swedish people